The Philippine House Committee on Aquaculture and Fisheries Resources, or House Aquaculture and Fisheries Resources Committee is a standing committee of the Philippine House of Representatives.

Jurisdiction 
As prescribed by House Rules, the committee's jurisdiction includes the following:
 Aquaculture and fisheries education and training including extension services, conservation of streams, rivers, lakes and other fisheries resources
 Aquaculture and fisheries production and development
 Business of aquaculture
 Fishpond and fisheries culture production and development including related technical, financial and guarantee assistance programs
 Fresh water and fisheries culture research and technology applications
 Use of aquatic resources

Members, 18th Congress

Historical members

18th Congress

Member for the Majority 
 Bernardita Ramos (Sorsogon–2nd, NPC)

See also 
 House of Representatives of the Philippines
 List of Philippine House of Representatives committees
 Bureau of Fisheries and Aquatic Resources

Notes

References

External links 
House of Representatives of the Philippines

Aquaculture and Fisheries Resources
Agriculture in the Philippines